The 2001 Bristol City Council election took place on 7 June 2001, on the same day as other local elections. The Labour Party made a small number of gains and maintained overall control of the council.

Ashley

Avonmouth

Bishopston

Cabot

Clifton

Clifton East

Cotham

Easton

Eastville

Frome Vale

Henbury

Henleaze

Hillfields

Horfield

Kingsweston

Lawrence Hill

Lockleaze

Redland

Southmead

St George East

St George West

Stoke Bishop

Westbury-on-Trym

References

2001 English local elections
2001
2000s in Bristol
June 2001 events in the United Kingdom